The 1983 Spanish motorcycle Grand Prix was the fifth round of the 1983 Grand Prix motorcycle racing season. It took place on the weekend of 20–22 May 1983 at the Circuito Permanente del Jarama.

Classification

500 cc

References

Spanish motorcycle Grand Prix
Spanish
Spanish motorcycle Grand Prix
motorcycle Grand Prix